Northeast 2nd Street is a proposed Tri-Rail Coastal Link Green Line station in Boca Raton, Florida. The station is slated for construction at the intersection of Dixie Highway and Northeast 2nd Street, just west of Federal Highway (US 1). Brightline has plans to offer service to the station.

References

External links
 Proposed site in Google Maps Street View

Buildings and structures in Boca Raton, Florida
Tri-Rail stations in Palm Beach County, Florida
Proposed Tri-Rail stations